The Pea Ridge Commercial Historic District encompasses the historic commercial center of Pea Ridge, Arkansas.  It includes twelve buildings on Pickens Street between Greene and Davis Streets, and another seven on Curtis Street between Pike and Macintosh Streets.  Of these nineteen commercial and civic buildings, thirteen are historically significant.  Most of these are typical commercial buildings built between 1910 and 1930, although several date to the 1950s.  Some businesses, such as Webb's Feed Store, have been in business since the early period of development, in their original premises.  The town grew as an agricultural center serving first local apple growers, and then tomato growers after blight destroyed many apple orchards.

The district was listed on the National Register of Historic Places in 2007.

See also
National Register of Historic Places listings in Benton County, Arkansas

References

Historic districts on the National Register of Historic Places in Arkansas
Buildings designated early commercial in the National Register of Historic Places in Arkansas
Historic districts in Benton County, Arkansas
National Register of Historic Places in Benton County, Arkansas